Epistomiidae is a family of bryozoans belonging to the order Cheilostomatida.

Genera:
 Acenia Gistl, 1848
 Epistomia Fleming, 1828
 Mononota Pieper, 1881
 Synnotum Pieper, 1881

References

Cheilostomatida